Grigory Rabinovich (born 1892, date of death unknown) was a medical doctor and KGB Officer. He was sent to the United States in the 1930s. His cover was a worker for the Russian Red Cross. His mission was to "supervise penetration of the American Trotskyist movement".

References

KGB officers
1892 births
Year of death missing
Soviet expatriates in the United States